Prior restraint (also referred to as prior censorship or pre-publication censorship) is censorship imposed, usually by a government or institution, on expression, that prohibits particular instances of expression.  It is in contrast to censorship which establishes general subject matter restrictions and reviews a particular instance of expression only after the expression has taken place.

In some countries (e.g., United States, Argentina) prior restraint by the government is forbidden, subject to exceptions (such as classifying certain matters of national security), by their respective constitutions.

Prior restraint can be effected in a number of ways. For example, the exhibition of works of art or a movie may require a license from a government authority (sometimes referred to as a classification board or censorship board) before it can be published, and the failure or refusal to grant a license is a form of censorship as is the revoking of a license. It can take the form of a legal injunction or government order prohibiting the publication of a specific document. Sometimes, a government or other party becomes aware of a forthcoming publication on a particular subject and seeks to prevent it: to halt ongoing publication and prevent its resumption. These injunctions are considered prior restraint because potential future publications are stopped in advance. It can also take the form of a (usually secret) policy imposed by a commercial corporation upon its employees, requiring them to obtain written permission to publish a given written work, even one authored outside of work hours produced using their own computing resources.

Exceptions to restrictions
Not all restrictions on free speech are a breach of the prior restraint doctrine. In many cases invocation of national security is controversial, with opponents of suppression arguing that government errors and embarrassment are being covered up; examples are given below.

Publication of information on legal cases in progress may be restricted by an injunction. (Otherwise publishing of material which may affect a case is subject to penalties, but not prevented from the outset.)
Text and video information containing illegal context, such as pornography involving underage or unwilling individuals are generally censored in order to protect the victim/s of the material, and preserve the legal and ethical standards of the country/state initiating the censorship of the offensive material.

Anglo-American legal tradition

Blackstone and early views
In William Blackstone's Commentaries "Freedom of the Press" is defined as the right to be free from prior restraints. In addition, he held that a person should not be punished for speaking or writing the truth, with good motives and for justifiable ends.  Truth alone, however, was not considered a sufficient justification, if published with bad motives.

This view was the common legal understanding at the time the U.S. Constitution was adopted. Only later have the concepts of freedom of speech and the press been extended (in the United States, the United Kingdom, and other countries sharing their legal tradition) to protect honest error, or truth even if published for questionable reasons.

Judicial view
Prior restraint is often considered a particularly oppressive form of censorship in Anglo-American jurisprudence because it prevents the restricted material from being heard or distributed at all.  Other forms of restrictions on expression (such as actions for libel or criminal libel, slander, defamation, and contempt of court) implement criminal or civil sanctions only after the offending material has been published.  While such sanctions might lead to a chilling effect, legal commentators argue that at least such actions do not directly impoverish the marketplace of ideas.  Prior restraint, on the other hand, takes an idea or material completely out of the marketplace. Thus it is often considered to be the most extreme form of censorship.  The United States Supreme Court expressed this view in Nebraska Press Assn. v. Stuart by noting:

Also, most of the early struggles for freedom of the press were against forms of prior restraint. Thus prior restraint came to be looked upon with a particular horror, and Anglo-American courts became particularly unwilling to approve it, when they might approve other forms of press restriction.

United States

Near v. Minnesota 

The first notable case in which the United States Supreme Court ruled on a prior restraint issue was Near v. Minnesota, . In that case the Court held prior restraints to be unconstitutional, except in extremely limited circumstances such as national security issues.  The ruling came about after Jay Near's newspaper, The Saturday Press, a small local paper that ran countless exposés of Minneapolis's elected officials' alleged illicit activities, including gambling, racketeering, and graft, was silenced by the Minnesota Gag Law of 1925, also known as The Public Nuisance Law. Near's critics called his paper a scandal sheet, and alleged that he tried to extort money by threatening to publish attacks on officials and others.  
In the Near case the Court held that the state had no power to enjoin the publication of the paper in this way – that any such action would be unconstitutional under the First Amendment. It wrote:

If we cut through mere details of procedure, the operation and effect of the statute in substance is that public authorities may bring the owner or publisher of a newspaper or periodical before a judge upon a charge of conducting a business of publishing scandalous and defamatory matter — in particular that the matter consists of charges against public officers of official dereliction — and, unless the owner or publisher is able and disposed to bring competent evidence to satisfy the judge that the charges are true and are published with good motives and for justifiable ends, his newspaper or periodical is suppressed and further publication is made punishable as a contempt. This is of the essence of censorship.

And

This was an extension of the Court's earlier views, which had followed Blackstone. In Patterson v. Colorado, the Court had written: "In the first place, the main purpose of such constitutional provisions is 'to prevent all such previous restraints upon publications as had been practiced by other governments,' and they do not prevent the subsequent punishment of such as may be deemed contrary to the public welfare." (quoted in the Near decision).  The Near decision was the first time that it was held that even alleged untruth or malicious intent would not be sufficient reason to impose prior restraints.

Near was decided 5–4. The four dissenting justices strongly approved of the "gag law", and felt that the nature of the articles in The Saturday Press, including their recurrent antisemitism, their frequent (allegedly false) accusations of official misconduct, and their disrespectful and confrontational tone, made them unworthy of protection. But this view did not prevail.

After the Near decision, newspapers had a clearly established freedom to criticize public officials without fear of retribution, even when charges made by the papers could not be proven in court. Newspapers could still be punished through libel laws, if they published material found to be untrue. The "Gag Law" was unique in the United States at that time, and even in Minnesota had only been used on two occasions. Indeed, the Court commented on the unusual nature of the proceeding in its decision.

The Court in Near left open the possibility of prior restraints for various exceptional purposes, such as national security, control of obscenity, and the like. It wrote:

Near's dicta suggest that, while a constitutional prior restraint can exist, the high burden of proof necessary to demonstrate constitutionality results in a presumption of invalidity, and the government bears the burden of showing the restraint's constitutionality.

In a later case (Nebraska Press Ass'n v. Stuart), the Court wrote:

This shows the strong later acceptance of what had been a disputed decision when it was first handed down.

Kinney v. Barnes 
In the 2012 case of Kinney v. Barnes, Kinney, a legal recruiter, was the subject of inflammatory comments on the website of the company who previously employed him. The company claimed he received extra incentives on the job causing his termination. Although the court ruled that the statements posted concerning Kinney must be removed, they did not prohibit similar speech from being posted online. Their reasoning was that prior restraint shall not be enacted on the basis that it is better to punish unprotected speech rather than hinder any possible protected speech.

Wartime censorship

During World War I, and to a greater extent during World War II, war correspondents accompanied military forces, and their reports were subject to advance censorship to preserve military secrets. The extent of such censorship was not generally challenged, and no major court case arose from this issue. In later conflicts the degree to which war reporting was subject to censorship varied, and in some cases it has been alleged that the censorship was as much political as military in purpose. This was particularly true during the Vietnam War and the 1983 invasion of Grenada.

Pentagon Papers case
In the Pentagon Papers case (New York Times Co. v. United States), the Nixon administration sought to enjoin The New York Times and The Washington Post newspapers from publishing excerpts from a top-secret United States Department of Defense history of the United States involvement in the Vietnam War from 1945 to 1971. The government tried to use the "national security" exception that had been suggested in the Near decision. The Supreme Court struck down the injunctions. However, the decision was fragmented, with nine separate opinions being filed in the case.  It was not clear at the time what the effect would be on future prior restraint cases.

H-bomb article cases

Scientific American
On March 15, 1950 Scientific American magazine published an article by Hans Bethe about thermonuclear fusion, the mechanism by which stars generate energy and emit electromagnetic radiation (light, etc.). Fusion is also the process which makes the hydrogen bomb (H-bomb) possible. The AEC (Atomic Energy Commission) ordered publication stopped. Several thousand copies of the printed magazine were destroyed, and the article was published with some text removed at the direction of the AEC. At this time there existed in the United States no workable design for a hydrogen bomb (the Teller–Ulam design would not be developed for another year), but the U.S. was engaged in a crash program to develop one. Gerard Piel, the publisher of Scientific American, complained that the AEC was "suppressing information which the American People need in order to form intelligent judgments". Bethe, however, declined to support this complaint, and the suppression of the unedited version of the article was never litigated.

The Progressive

In February 1979, an anti-nuclear activist named Howard Morland drafted an article for The Progressive magazine, entitled "The H-Bomb Secret: To Know How is to Ask Why". The article was an attempt by Morland to publish what he thought the "H-Bomb Secret" was (the Teller–Ulam design), derived from various unclassified sources and informal interviews with scientists and plant workers. Through a number of complicated circumstances, the Department of Energy attempted to enjoin its publication, alleging that the article contained sensitive technical information which was (1) probably derived from classified sources, or (2) became a classified source when compiled in a correct way, even if it were derived from unclassified sources, based on the "born secret" provisions of the 1954 Atomic Energy Act. A preliminary injunction was granted against the article's publication, and Morland and the magazine appealed (United States v. The Progressive, et al.). After a lengthy set of hearings (one in camera, another open to the public), and attracting considerable attention as a "freedom of the press" case, the government dropped its charges after it claimed the case became moot when another bomb speculator (Chuck Hansen) published his own views on the "secret" (many commentators speculated that they were afraid the Atomic Energy Act would be overturned under such scrutiny). The article was duly published in The Progressive (in the November 1979 issue) six months after it was originally scheduled, and remains available in libraries. (As an aside, Morland himself decided that he did not have the secret, and published a "corrected" version a month later.)

Judicial gag orders
Frequently a court will impose advance restrictions on lawyers, parties, and on the press in reporting of trials, particularly criminal trials. These restrictions are intended to protect the right to a fair trial, and to avoid interference with the judicial process. Nonetheless, they are a form of prior restraint, and the press in particular has often objected to such orders.

In Nebraska Press Assn. v. Stuart, the United States Supreme Court overturned such a "gag order". It ruled that alternative methods to help ensure a fair trial, short of prior restraints, might have been used, and that it was not all clear, under the circumstances, that the gag order would have the desired effect even if upheld.  It also made a particular point of asserting that orders restricting reporting on events that occur in open court are not permissible. It wrote:

To the extent that this order prohibited the reporting of evidence adduced at the open preliminary hearing, it plainly violated settled principles: '[T]here is nothing that proscribes the press from reporting events that transpire in the courtroom.' Sheppard v. Maxwell, (384 U.S., at 362–363).

The Court's conclusion in this case reaffirmed its general opposition to prior restraints, and indicated that judicial gag orders would be sustained only in exceptional cases.  It wrote:

Our analysis ends as it began, with a confrontation between prior restraint imposed to protect one vital constitutional guarantee and the explicit command of another that the freedom to speak and publish shall not be abridged. We reaffirm that the guarantees of freedom of expression are not an absolute prohibition under all circumstances, but the barriers to prior restraint remain high and the presumption against its use continues intact.

In the United Kingdom judicial gag orders are much more frequently employed, and the strong prejudice against them reflected in the above quote does not seem to be felt by British courts. Other countries also employ such orders more freely than the United States does.

DeCSS case
In October 1999 the Motion Picture Association of America (MPAA) learned of the availability on the Internet of DeCSS, a program that allowed people to view the content of DVDs using computers that lacked commercial DVD players, bypassing the encryption system known as the Content Scrambling System (CSS) generally used on commercial DVDs. The MPAA responded by sending out a number of cease and desist letters to web site operators who posted the software. In January 2000, a lawsuit was filed against the publisher of the magazine 2600: The Hacker Quarterly, and others. This case is known as Universal v. Reimerdes, .

The suit asked for an injunction under the U.S. Digital Millennium Copyright Act (DMCA) prohibiting the 2600 site from posting the DeCSS code. It also asked for a prohibition on linking to other sites that posted the code.

The injunction was issued and sustained in an appeal to the U.S. Court of Appeals for the Second Circuit and the constitutionality of the DMCA was upheld. The district court wrote that the computer code "... does more, in other words, than convey a message" and that  "... it has a distinctly functional, non-speech aspect in addition to reflecting the thoughts of the programmers."  The appeals court later wrote that "Under the circumstances amply shown by the record, the injunction's linking prohibition validly regulates the Appellants' opportunity instantly to enable anyone anywhere to gain unauthorized access to copyrighted movies on DVDs" thus upholding the injunction against publishing links to the DeCSS code in these circumstances.

The appeals court did consider the prior restraint and free expression issues, but treated the DeCSS program primarily as a means of evading copyright protection, and under that theory, held that the 2600 site could be permanently enjoined from posting the DeCSS code, and from linking to sites that posted it in an attempt to make the code available. The case was not taken to the Supreme Court.

Theater and motion pictures
There is a long history of prior restraints on the theater; in the United Kingdom stage plays still required a license until 1968. This attitude was early transferred to motion pictures, and prior restraints were retained for films long after they had been dropped for other forms of publication: in some jurisdictions, a film had to be submitted to a film censor board in order to be approved for showing.

The United States Supreme Court upheld the use of a board of censors in Mutual Film Corporation v. Industrial Commission of Ohio,  by deciding that the First Amendment did not apply to motion pictures. The power of such boards was weakened when the Supreme Court later overruled itself and decided that the First Amendment does apply to motion pictures.  In the case of Joseph Burstyn, Inc. v. Wilson, the court decided that giving the power to forbid or restrict a film to a censorship board on the grounds a film was "sacrilegious" was far too damaging to the protections of the First Amendment.

The "death knell" for censorship boards occurred in 1965 when the U.S. Supreme Court found the Maryland law making it a crime to exhibit a film without submitting it to the censorship board was unconstitutional.  In Freedman v. Maryland, the state's requirement that a film be presented to the board was unconstitutional as it lacked adequate procedural safeguards.  While it is not necessarily unconstitutional to require films to be submitted to a censorship board, the board has extremely limited options: a censorship board has no power to prohibit a film, and, if the law grants it that power, the law is unconstitutional.  The board's only options when a film is presented to it are either to grant a license for the film or immediately go to court to enjoin its exhibition.

Also, state or local censorship boards had been found to have no jurisdiction over broadcasts by television stations, even when located in the state or community where they are grounded, thus eliminating yet another reason for their existence.

Both the state of Maryland and the province of Ontario retained film censor boards to a particularly late date.  Maryland abandoned its board in the 1980s, and a 2004 decision of the Ontario Court of Appeal, reversing a previous trend in favor of the Ontario Film Classification Board's right to insist on cuts, ruled that the province had no right to insist on cuts as a condition of release in view of the fact that Canadian federal obscenity laws were sufficient to deal with obscene material.  In May 2005, the Ontario government ended the power of the Classification Board to insist on cuts, requiring all films with adult content that were not judged obscene to be rated "R" for adults only.

In many countries, legally effective rating systems are in effect. See History of British Film Certificates for information on film restrictions in the UK.

Industry codes
Many industries have formulated "voluntary" codes limiting the content of expression, generally affecting perceived effects on public morality rather than revelation of secrets.  Examples of these include the Hays Code, which affected Hollywood films from the 1930s to the 1950s, and the Comics Code, which was designed to deal with the rise of horror comics in the 1950s and lasted into the 1970s. The movie rating system currently in effect in the United States, run by the Motion Picture Association of America (MPAA) is another such industry code. Such codes have generally been adopted with the twofold purposes of forestalling possible government intervention and avoiding unfavorable publicity or boycotts. While such codes are not generally enforced by governmental action, they are generally enforced on content producers by gatekeepers in the marketing chain: studios in the case of the Hays Code, distributors in the case of the Comics Code and theater chains in the case of the MPAA rating system. Content producers have often objected to these codes and argue that they are, in effect, a form of prior restraint. However, the first amendment prohibition of prior restraint applies to government or court action and does not bind private entities such as theater chains.

See also 

 Censorship in the United States
 DA-Notice
 Imprimatur
 Media transparency
 The Mortgage Specialists, Inc. v. Implode-Explode Heavy Industries, Inc., a New Hampshire Supreme Court case applying prior restraint law to online defendants.
 Tory v. Cochran
 United States free speech exceptions
 Westmoreland v. CBS

References

Bibliography
 Born Secret: The H-Bomb, the Progressive Case and National Security  Devolpi (Pergamon) 1981
 The Secret that Exploded, Howard Morland  (Random House) 1981 About the Progressive case.
 Minnesota Rag: Corruption, Yellow Journalism, and the Case That Saved Freedom of the Press, Fred W. Friendly (University of Minnesota Press) 1982 A history of the Near case.
 The Good Guys, The Bad Guys and The First Amendment: Free speech vs. fairness in broadcasting by Fred W. Friendly (Random House; 1976)
 Make No Law : The Sullivan Case and the First Amendment  Anthony Lewis (Random House) 1991 A history of the case that established the actual malice standard for libel of public officials.
 Beyond the Burning Cross: A Landmark Case of Race, Censorship, and the First Amendment  Edward J. Cleary (Vintage) 1995 A History of R.A.V. v. St Paul a "hate crime" case.
 The Day the Presses Stopped: A History of the Pentagon Papers Case David Rudenstine (University of California Press) 1996
 American Aurora: A Democratic-Republican Returns : The Suppressed History of Our Nation's Beginnings and the Heroic Newspaper That Tried to Report It Richard N. Rosenfeld (St. Martin's Press) 1997 A newspaper suppression case in the early years of the United States.
 Press Censorship in Elizabethan England  Cyndia Susan Clegg (Cambridge University Press) 1997
 Flag Burning and Free Speech: The Case of Texas v. Johnson  Robert Justin Goldstein (University Press of Kansas) 2000
 The Law of Public Communication Kent R. Middleton, William E. Lee, and Bill F. Chamberlin (Allyn & Bacon) 2003 A general survey of the current US law.
 The Tyranny of Printers": Newspaper Politics in the Early American Republic Jeffrey L. Pasley (University Press of Virginia) 2003
 Perilous Times: Free Speech in Wartime from The Sedition Act of 1798 to The War on Terrorism Geoffrey R. Stone (W. W. Norton & Company) 2004

Further reading
 Michal Tamir and Ariel Bendor, "Prior Restraint in the Digital Age" (2019) William & Mary Bill of Rights Journal

External links
 "Prior Restraint" on Findlaw
 "A Texas Judge Cited 'The Big Lebowski' In A Legal Decision" by Paul Szoldra, Business Insider, 5 September 2014
 "Prior Restraint" by Barry O. Hines, R. Kurt Wilke, & Sarah M. Lahr
 Wisconsin Free Speech Legacy's extensive discussion of the case and the stages it went through

American legal terminology
Censorship
First Amendment to the United States Constitution